A criminal code (or penal code) is a document that compiles all, or a significant amount of a particular jurisdiction's criminal law. Typically a criminal code will contain offences that are recognised in the jurisdiction, penalties that might be imposed for these offences, and some general provisions (such as definitions and prohibitions on retroactive prosecution).

Criminal codes are relatively common in civil law jurisdictions, which tend to build legal systems around codes and principles which are relatively abstract and apply them on a case-by-case basis. Conversely they are not as common in common law jurisdictions.

The proposed introduction of a criminal code in England and Wales was a significant project of the Law Commission from 1968 to 2008. Due to the strong tradition of legal precedent in the jurisdiction and consequently the large number of binding legal judgements and ambiguous 'common law offences', as well as the often inconsistent nature of English law, the creation of a satisfactory code became very difficult. The project was officially abandoned in 2008 although as of 2009 it has been revived. 

A statutory Criminal Law Codification Advisory Committee for Irish criminal law met from 2007 to 2010 and its Draft Criminal Code and Commentary was published in 2011.

In the United States, a Model Penal Code exists which is not itself law but which provides the basis for the criminal law of many states. Individual states often choose to make use of criminal codes which are often based, to a varying extent on the model code.  Title 18 of the United States Code is the criminal code for federal crimes. However, Title 18 does not contain many of the general provisions concerning criminal law that are found in the criminal codes of many so-called "civil law" countries.

Criminal codes are generally supported for their introduction of consistency to legal systems and for making the criminal law more accessible to laypeople.  A code may help avoid a chilling effect where legislation and case law appears to be either inaccessible or beyond comprehension to non-lawyers. Alternatively critics have argued that codes are too rigid and that they fail to provide enough flexibility for the law to be effective.

By country

 Australian criminal codes 
 Criminal Code of Belarus
 Penal Code of Brazil
 British Virgin Islands Criminal Code
 Criminal Code (Canada)
 Criminal Code of Chile
  Criminal Law of the People's Republic of China (zh)
 Criminal Code of the Czech Republic (2009)
 Danish Penal Code (Denmark)
 English Criminal Code, a draft has existed since 1989 but, though debated since 1818, has never been enacted
 Criminal Code of Finland
 French Penal Code
 German Criminal Code
 Hungarian Penal Code in English, status of 18 August 2005 ; Operative Hungarian Penal Code
 General Penal Code (Iceland)
 Indian Penal Code and Code of Criminal Procedure
 Indonesian Criminal Code (Kitab Undang-Undang Hukum Pidana) and Code of Criminal Procedure (Kitab Undang-Undang Hukum Acara Pidana)
 Israeli Penal Law, 5737-1977
 Iranian Criminal Code
 Iraqi Penal Code
 Italian Penal Code
 Penal Code of Japan
 Penal Code of Macau
 Penal Code (Malaysia), enacted in 1936.
 Criminal Code of Malta, enacted in 1854.
 Mexican Penal Code, enacted on August 14, 1931.
 Myanmar Penal Code, enacted on 1 May 1861
 General Code of Nepal
 Penal Code of the Netherlands (Wetboek van Strafrecht)
 New Zealand Crimes Act 1961
 Pakistan Penal Code
 Revised Penal Code of the Philippines
 Polish Penal Code
 Penal Code of Portugal
 Penal Code of Romania
 Criminal Code of Russia
 Penal Code of South Korea
 Penal Code of Sri Lanka
 Penal Code of Singapore
 Spanish Criminal Code, enacted for the first time in 1822. Current version dates back to 1995.
 Swiss Criminal Code
 Syrian Penal Code
 Turkish Penal Code (also see its articles 301 and 312)
 Criminal Code of Ukraine
 Title 18 of the United States Code
 Model Penal Code by the American Law Institute
 List of U.S. state statutory codes
 Vietnamese Penal Code, first enacted in 1985

See also
 Codification
 Civil code

References